The 2011 North District Council election was held on 6 November 2011 to elect all 17 elected members to the 24-member District Council. The Beijing loyalist party Democratic Alliance for the Betterment and Progress of Hong Kong (DAB) won the majority of the seats by claiming 14 seats, while the Democratic Party, the pan-democrat flagship party, lost 3 seats and retained only one seat in Luen Wo Hui.

Overall election results
Before election:

Change in composition:

References

External links
 Election Results - Overall Results

2011 Hong Kong local elections